Revue Biblique is an academic journal published by the École Biblique, an institute of a French community of Dominicans based in Jerusalem. The journal was established in 1892 by Pierre Batiffol and Marie-Joseph Lagrange.

Various volumes

1892
1893
1894
1895
1896
1897
1898
1899

1900
1901
1902
1903
1904
1905
1906
1907
1908
1909

1969

External links
  
 
 Revue Biblique at the Internet Archive

Catholic studies journals
French-language journals
Publications established in 1892